3-Fluorodeschloroketamine (3F-DCK, 3-FDCK, FXM) is a recreational designer drug related to ketamine. It is from the arylcyclohexylamine family and has dissociative effects. It was made illegal in Finland in August 2019.

See also 
 2-Fluorodeschloroketamine
 3-Fluoro-PCP
 Deschloroketamine
 Fluorexetamine
 Methoxmetamine

References 

Arylcyclohexylamines
Designer drugs
Dissociative drugs
Fluoroarenes
Secondary amines